WVXU (91.7 FM) is a public radio station located in Cincinnati, Ohio. It is owned by Cincinnati Public Radio, which also operates station WGUC and WMUB. It airs public radio news and talk syndicated programming from National Public Radio, American Public Media and Public Radio Exchange.

History, union with WGUC
The station was originally licensed to Xavier University; it featured primarily a jazz and progressive rock format.  It became an NPR member when the network's Morning Edition was added to the schedule in 1981.  The original NPR member for the Cincinnati area, WGUC, did not want to replace its popular morning drive-time classical music show with the newsmagazine, so WVXU started carrying Morning Edition and other NPR programs. WGUC continued carrying NPR's flagship afternoon newsmagazine All Things Considered.

WVXU then added more news and talk programs to supplement its eclectic music schedule, coinciding with the expansion of NPR's schedule in the 1980s. While WGUC and WVXU between them provided most of the NPR programs available to a single market, the two NPR flagship news magazines aired separately. WVXU featured programs from the Golden Age of Radio and in 1994 won the Peabody Award for their 12-hour "D-Day Plus 50 Years" broadcast commemorating the anniversary of D-Day, capturing the day's history through historic broadcast recordings.

On August 22, 2005, Xavier transferred ownership WVXU and its "X-Star Network" of translator stations to CPRI in a $15-million transaction, bringing the station and WGUC under the same licensee. This permitted elimination of program duplication and a realignment of formats. WGUC transferred nearly all of its remaining spoken-word programming, including All Things Considered, to WVXU. WGUC now airs classical music almost exclusively, while WVXU carries news and information programs, including both NPR flagship news magazines, and carried some music programs on weeknights and weekends after the ownership change.

Cincinnati Public Radio took over management of WMUB in March 2009, a station licensed to Miami University in Oxford, Ohio. As part of the deal, Miami retained ownership of the station serving southwestern Ohio and southeastern Indiana, though it is now a full-time satellite of WVXU.  WMUB brings WVXU's programming to areas north of Cincinnati where the main signal is weak.

Current Programming
WVXU and WMUB continues to carry programs from NPR and PRI and the station carries most of the major public radio programs, including Morning Edition All Things Considered, Marketplace and Fresh Air.  In addition, a locally produced talk show, Cincinnati Edition, airs each weekday at 12:00pm.  WVXU has a news team of seven staff members who report and host, and the station's website is augmented by Howard Wilkinson (Blogger and Politics Reporter) and John Kiesewetter (Media blogger.)  In 2021, WVXU dropped any remaining music programs continued after the 2005 takeover and is now a 100% news and talk station.

Community events
Since beginning operation of WVXU in August 2005, the station has brought in a variety of public radio hosts and programs and acts as media sponsor for various community-wide events.

Examples of shows and hosts who have visited Cincinnati: live broadcasts of "A Prairie Home Companion," "Whad'ya Know," and "Talk of the Nation." Recorded episode of "Wait Wait Don't Tell Me," Visits from Ira Glass ("This American Life"), Lynne Rossetto Kasper ("The Splendid Table"), Terry Gross ("Fresh Air"), Diane Rehm ("The Diane Rehm Show"), and Carl Kasell (NPR News and "Wait Wait Don't Tell Me").

Former translator network
Shortly after CPRI acquired WVXU, it sold the network of translator stations ("X-Star") that Xavier had built in rural parts of Ohio and Michigan during the 1990s WVXU FAQ to provide service to those outside the clear signal of another NPR affiliate. The Ohio frequencies were acquired by an evangelical Christian broadcaster, while the Michigan stations were sold to commercial interests.

In addition to WVXU, the X-Star network included:
WVXA Rogers City, Michigan (now 96.7 WRGZ)
WVXC Chillicothe, Ohio (now 89.3 WZCP)
WVXG Mount Gilead, Ohio (95.1) 
WVXH Harrison, Michigan (now 92.1 WTWS)
WVXI Crawfordsville, Indiana (now 106.3 WCDQ (FM))
WVXM West Union, Ohio/Maysville, Kentucky: Later, WVXM was assigned to the Manistee, Michigan, translator and the West Union translator was given the WVXW call letters (now 89.5 WZWP)
WVXM Manistee, Michigan (now 97.7 WMLQ)
WVXR New Paris, Ohio/Richmond, Indiana (now 89.3 WKRT)
W237CF Mackinaw City, Michigan

HD radio
In addition to airing its regular programming in digital sound on HD Radio, WVXU airs Radio Artifact, a local music service owned and produced by Northside's Urban Artifact on its second (HD2) sideband channel.

See also
 Cincinnati Public Radio
 WMUB

References

External links
91.7 WVXU

Radio Artifact On WVXU-HD2

VXU
NPR member stations